Alucita amalopis is a moth of the family Alucitidae. It is found on Samoa.

References

Moths described in 1927
Alucitidae
Moths of Oceania
Taxa named by Edward Meyrick